Advantage Hart is a 2003 American short film directed by Jeff Seibenick. It stars Shad Hart, Sam Jaeger, Sam Lloyd, Kate Bosworth, and Amber Mellott.

It was written and produced by Michael Hobert and Sam Jaeger.

Premise 
When tennis player Shad Hart goes to enter the Mayflower tournament to face his nemesis Colt Skyler, he learns that Skyler's father raised the entry fee to $500. With the help of friend Blaze and sister Chrystal he raises the money, but then the money is stolen.

Cast 
Shad Hart as Shad Hart
Sam Jaeger as Colt Skyler
Sam Lloyd as Gus Blanderskud
Kate Bosworth as Trinity Montage
Amber Mellott as Piper Township
Michael Hobert as Blaze Township
Matt Czuchry as Clame Buckley
Daniel Hobert as Brent DewBerry III
Rae-Mi LeRoy as Chrystal Hart
Jill Tracey as Beverlyglen Blanderskud

Soundtrack 
The film contains several songs by the band Drive, She Said.

Screenings 
The film had its premiere at The Hollywood Film Festival and toured on the film festival circuit.

References

External links 

2003 films
Tennis films
2003 comedy films
2003 short films
American comedy short films
2000s English-language films
2000s American films
English-language comedy films